Nathnagar Assembly constituency is one of 243 constituencies of legislative assembly of Bihar. It comes under Bhagalpur Lok Sabha constituency along with other assembly constituencies viz. Gopalpur, Pirpainti, Kahalgaon, Bhagalpur and Bihpur.

Overview
Nathnagar comprises CD Blocks Nathnagar & Sabour; Gram Panchayats Puraini North, Puraini South, Baluachak Puraini, Sanholi, Baijani, Khiribandh, Jamani, Saino, Bhawanipur Desri, Chandapur, Jagdishpur, Sonuchak-Puraini, Imampur, Shajangi & Habibipur (CT) of Jagdishpur CD Block.

Members of Legislative Assembly

^Bypolls

Election results

2020

2015

References

External links
 

Politics of Bhagalpur district
Assembly constituencies of Bihar